Selkirk was a federal electoral district in Manitoba, Canada, that was represented in the House of Commons of Canada from 1871 to 1979.

This riding was created in 1871 when the province of Manitoba was created.

It was abolished in 1976 when it was redistributed into Provencher, Selkirk—Interlake, Winnipeg North Centre and Winnipeg—Birds Hill ridings.

It was recreated in 1987 from parts Selkirk—Interlake, Winnipeg North Centre and Winnipeg—Birds Hill ridings. For information about that riding, see Selkirk—Red River. This new incarnation was renamed in 1990 to Selkirk—Red River and abolished in 1996.

Election results

1871–1882
By-election: On Manitoba joining Confederation, 15 July 1870

By-election: On election being declared void

1882–1896
During this time, the riding was moved from being in the Winnipeg area to the southwestern corner of the province.

By-election: On Mr. Daly being appointed Minister of the Interior and Superintendent General of Indian Affairs

1896–1974
Selkirk was moved out of the southwest, to the area north of Winnipeg.

By-election: On Mr. Thorson's acceptance of an office of emolument under the Crown, 6 October 1942

|-			

By-election: On Mr. Wood's death, 8 August 1954

By-election: On Mr. Schreyer's resignation, 9 June 1969

See also

 List of Canadian federal electoral districts
 Past Canadian electoral districts

External links

Former federal electoral districts of Manitoba
1871 establishments in Manitoba
1979 disestablishments in Manitoba